The American Champion Sprint Horse award is an  American Thoroughbred horse racing honor. Created in 1947, in 1971 it became part of the Eclipse Awards program and is awarded annually to the top horse in sprint races (usually those run at a distance of under one mile).

The Daily Racing Form (DRF) began naming an annual sprint champion in 1947. Starting in 1950, the Thoroughbred Racing Associations (TRA) began naming its own champion. The following list provides the name of the horses chosen by these organizations.

The Daily Racing Form, the Thoroughbred Racing Associations, and the National Turf Writers Association all joined forces in 1971 to create the Eclipse Award.

Through 2006, the Sprint Champion was chosen from a horse of either sex. In 2007, a separate category honoring the American Champion Female Sprint Horse became part of the Eclipse Awards program.

From 1960 through 1963 no award was given.

Honorees

References

Horse racing awards
Horse racing in the United States